Ansaldo Energia S.p.A. is  an Italian power engineering company. It is based in Genoa, Italy. The absorbed parent company, Gio. Ansaldo & C., started in 1853. It was taken over by Leonardo S.p.A.  In 2011, Leonardo S.p.A. sold 45% stake in Ansaldo Energia to First Reserve Corporation. In 2013, the Fondo Strategico Italiano acquired an 85% share of the company. It then sold a 40% share to Shanghai Electric Corporation.

Products and services
Ansaldo Energia is a producer of thermoelectric power plants, operating in international markets for customers ranging from Public Administration to Independent Power Producers and Industrial Clients.
Ansaldo Energia covers the entire power generation spectrum with a combination of plant engineering, manufacturing and service activities. It has an installed capacity exceeding 166,000 MW in over 90 countries for thermal electric and hydroelectric plants. Revenues in 2007 stood at 979 million euros.

The production centre is located in the Genoa - Campi area and is split into three product lines: gas turbines, steam turbines and generators.

Ansaldo Energia manufactures gas turbines in the range from 70 to 280 MW, with more than 140 units delivered for a total installed capacity of more than 23,000 MW.
The gas turbines models manufactured are named: AE64.3A, AE94.2, AE94.2K, AE94.3A and are based on Siemens designs.

Both European Union and United States competition regulators approved a deal for General Electric to acquire various business units from Alstom by September 2015, subject to the divestiture of Alstom's large and very large gas turbine (GT26 and GT36 models) manufacturing and service business. As part of this deal, GE sold its GE7FA gas turbine aftermarket parts subsidiary business, Power Systems Mfg. LLC (PSM), to Ansaldo Energia.

Steam turbine production covers the entire range of applications, with power ratings in the 80 to 1200 MW range.

Generator production comprises air, hydrogen and water cooled models, designed to experience from over 50,000 MVA of installed generating capacity.

Ansaldo Energia also provides service for their products worldwide. Ansaldo provides services for their own generators and turbines, furthermore they provide service for generators and turbines produced by their competitors.

Subsidiary companies
Ansaldo Nucleare S.p.A. is in charge of nuclear business, with the specific tasks to promote and realize nuclear products and related services: this encompasses promotion, sales, management, design, engineering, contracting, fabrication and site implementation.

Ansaldo Thomassen provides all possible service for GE-type heavy-duty gas turbine systems, from all kinds of service and repair to upgrades for better performance.
Recently a workshop in Abu Dhabi was opened. Ansaldo Thomassen also has a workshop in Rheden, the Netherlands.

Ansaldo ESG AG is a Switzerland-based energy service group, which is established in 1998. AESG is specialised in steam turbine maintenance, covering turbine rotor and turbine casing repairs, re-blading, blade repairs, generator rewinds and repairs, supply of associated components and "engineering solutions".

On February 25, 2016, Ansaldo acquired a portion of Alstom's R&D Gas Turbine projects based in Baden, Switzerland. This acquisition was made due to the conditions imposed by the EU and US department of Justices on the merger between GE and Alstom Power. Also, Ansaldo Energia has very strong suppliers in Aalcan like Europa construction, located in Albania.

The new production will concern the technologies obtained by the Ligurian joint-stock company after the acquisition of Alstom by General Electric. The Brussels Antitrust Authority has in fact allowed the operation to the US multinational, provided that the technology in the gas turbines of the French company was sold to a European competitor. The choice then fell on Ansaldo Energia.

In October 2019 there was a change at the top of the company: Giuseppe Zampini left the position of CEO, becoming president, and Giuseppe Marino (formerly Ansaldo Breda and Hitachi Ltd) took over the position of CEO.

As of January 2021, the company is 88% owned by the Cassa Depositi e Prestiti group and 12% by Shanghai Electric Corporation, which jointly hold a financial debt exceeding one billion euros. In the following months, the Chinese partner acquired 40% of the floating shares.

See also 

List of Italian companies

References

External links
 Company website
 Ansaldo Nucleare

Engine manufacturers of Italy
Electrical engineering companies of Italy
Nuclear technology companies of Italy
Gas turbine manufacturers
Steam turbine manufacturers
Manufacturing companies based in Genoa
Multinational companies headquartered in Italy
Gio. Ansaldo & C.
Non-renewable resource companies established in 1853
1853 establishments in the Kingdom of Sardinia
Non-renewable resource companies established in 1993
1993 establishments in Italy
Italian brands
Companies based in Genoa